The European Commissioner for Crisis Management is a member of the European Commission. The portfolio was previously titled Commissioner for Humanitarian Aid and Civil Protection. The post is currently held by Janez Lenarčič.

The portfolio deals with the distribution of aid; the European Commission is the largest supplier of humanitarian aid in the world, accounting for more than 50 percent of aid distributed in 140 countries. The Commissioner oversees a total of 140 international humanitarian experts as well as 44 field offices in 39 countries, which are staffed by 320 local members. The Civil Protection mechanism of the Commission means that the position also covers the European Union's disaster response. It provides support if a member state requests aid after a natural disaster. This function has adopted a wider scope in recent years as the Commission increasingly becomes an instrument of support around the world. For example, the Commission provided aid to Morocco when the country was hit by an earthquake in February 2004. More than 1,000 aid workers were also dispatched to the United States after 11 September 2001 terrorist attack.

Although humanitarian aid and civil protection falls within the same Commission and administered by the same Commissioner, each has separate strategy document. In recent years, however, there is a focus on increased complementarity and synergy between the humanitarian aid approaches and civil protection expertise and assets.

Louis Michel as commissioner 

After the Israeli-Lebanese conflict in 2006 the Commissioner visited Lebanon and called for €30 million to repair the damage there. The Parliament's development committee was cautious though about the expenditure and he was also criticised for his slow response with one MEP comparing him to "a fireman who arrives at the scene after the fire has gone out". In the same debate MEPs attacked the Commissioner for "appearing partial in the Congolese elections" in describing Joseph Kabila as "the hope of Congo". Michel responded by saying he would have said the same about any candidate in the democratic elections. 

Louis Michel has caused some mild controversy in 2007 among MEPs when it became known that he is to take leave from his work to compete in Belgian elections. Generally Commissioners are meant to remain above national politics and the European Parliament's development committee asked the Parliament's legal service to assess if his participation violates the treaties.  During his absence (12 May 2007 onwards), Commissioner Rehn will take over his duties.

His head of cabinet is Sabine Weyand, deputy head; Koen Doens and spokesperson; Amadeu Altafaj-Tardio.

European Medical Corp
The European Medical Corp (EMC) is a civilian incident response team that was launched on 15 February 2016 by the European Union to provide an emergency response force to deal with outbreaks of epidemic disease anywhere in the world. The EMC was formed after the 2014 Ebola outbreak in West Africa when the WHO was criticized for a slow and insufficient response in the early stages of the Ebola outbreak.

The framework for the European Medical Corps is part of the EU Civil Protection Mechanism's new European Emergency Response Capacity (otherwise known as the 'voluntary pool').

The EMC is part of the emergency response capacity of European countries. Teams from nine EU member states—Belgium, Luxembourg, Spain, Germany, the Czech Republic, France, the Netherlands, Finland, and Sweden – are available for deployment in an emergency. The EMC consists of medical teams, public health teams, mobile biosafety laboratories, medical evacuation capacities, experts in public health and medical assessment and coordination, and technical and logistics support. Any country in need of assistance can make a request to the Emergency Response Coordination Centre, part of the European Commission's Humanitarian Aid and Civil Protection department.

The first deployment of the EMC was announced by the European Commissioner for Humanitarian Aid and Civil Protection on 12 May 2016, a response to the outbreak of yellow fever in Angola in 2016. An earlier concept of an emergency medical response team was Task Force Scorpio formed by the United Nations during the first Gulf War.

List of commissioners

See also
 ACP-EU Development Cooperation
 ECHO
 EuropeAid Co-operation Office
 European Development Fund

References

External links
 Commissioner's website
 Commission Development website
 Commission Humanitarian Aid website

 Inauguration, World Health Organization

International Cooperation, Humanitarian Aid and Crisis Response